"Silly Love" is a song recorded by an English rock band 10cc released as the third and final single from the album Sheet Music through UK Records in 1974.

Personnel
Lol Creme – lead vocals, rhythm guitar, backing vocals
Eric Stewart – vocals, lead guitar, electric guitar, grand piano, backing vocals
Kevin Godley – vocals, drums
Graham Gouldman – bass guitar, backing vocals

Chart performance

Weekly charts

Year-end charts

References

10cc songs
1974 songs
1974 singles
Songs written by Eric Stewart
Songs written by Lol Creme
UK Records singles